Hacıiyaslı  is a village in Mut district of  Mersin Province, Turkey. At , it is situated in the Göksu River valley. The village was founded by a Turkmen tribe named Karadöneli. As of 2012, the population of Hacıilyaslı was 382. Main economic activity is animal husbandry. Valuable produce cultivated at Hacıilyaslı include olive agricultural crops.

References

Villages in Mut District